A flammable liquid is a liquid which can be easily ignited in air at ambient temperatures, i.e. it has a flash point at or below nominal threshold temperatures defined by a number of national and international standards organisations.

The Occupational Safety and Health Administration (OSHA) of the United States Department of Labor defines a liquid as flammable if it has a flash point at or below 199.4 °F (93 °C). Prior to bringing regulations in line with the United Nations Globally Harmonized System of Classification and Labeling of Chemicals (GHS) in 2012, OSHA considered flammable liquids to be those with a flash point below 100 °F (37.8 °C). Those with flash points above 100 °F and below 200 °F (93.3 °C) were classified as combustible liquids. Studies show that the actual measure of a liquid's flammability, its flash point, is dependent on altitude.

Categorization 

Both OSHA and GHS further divide flammable liquids into 4 categories:

 Category I flammable liquids are those with boiling points ≤ 95 °F (35 °C) and flash points < 73 °F (23 °C)
 Category II flammable liquids are those with boiling points > 95 °F and flash points < 73 °F
 Category III flammable liquids are those with flash points > 73 °F and ≤ 140 °F (60 °C)
 Category IV flammable liquids are those with flash points > 140 °F and ≤ 199.4 °F

These categorizations are dependent upon a set altitude and atmospheric pressure, as both boiling point and flash point change with changes in pressure.

Labeling 
Both GHS and OSHA require the labeling of flammable liquids, on containers and safety data sheets, as follows:

See also 
Fire prevention
Fire protection
Flammability
List of R-phrases

References 

Fuels